Phosphoserine transaminase (PSAT, phosphoserine aminotransferase, 3-phosphoserine aminotransferase, hydroxypyruvic phosphate-glutamic transaminase, L-phosphoserine aminotransferase, phosphohydroxypyruvate transaminase, phosphohydroxypyruvic-glutamic transaminase, 3-O-phospho-L-serine:2-oxoglutarate aminotransferase, SerC, PdxC, 3PHP transaminase) is an enzyme with systematic name O-phospho-L-serine:2-oxoglutarate aminotransferase. This enzyme catalyses the following chemical reaction

 (1) O-phospho-L-serine + 2-oxoglutarate  3-phosphonooxypyruvate + L-glutamate
 (2) 4-phosphonooxy-L-threonine + 2-oxoglutarate  (3R)-3-hydroxy-2-oxo-4-phosphonooxybutanoate + L-glutamate

This enzyme is a pyridoxal-phosphate protein.

See also 
 PSAT1

References

External links 
 

EC 2.6.1